The Ghost of Ohio is the second studio album by American singer Andy Black. It was released on April 12, 2019, on Lava and Republic Records.

The album was released on April 12, 2019, the same day as its lead single, "Westwood Road". Loudwire named it one of the 50 best rock albums of 2019.

Track listing

Charts

References

2019 albums
Andy Biersack albums
Lava Records albums